Menyllus is a genus of longhorn beetles of the subfamily Lamiinae, containing the following species:

 Menyllus maculicornis Pascoe, 1864
 Menyllus rotundipennis Breuning, 1968

References

Pteropliini
Cerambycidae genera